"But You're Mine" is a pop song written by Sonny Bono and recorded by Sonny & Cher.  The song reached its peak of popularity in 1965, when it charted in the US and the United Kingdom.

The lyrics make reference to a hippie couple who do not fit into the larger society to which they belong, but who are still happy because they have each other. The song has been covered by Patty Pravo with italian text as Ragazzo triste (sad boy).

Billboard described the song as an "exciting rhythm ballad with offbeat message lyric."

Charts

References

Sonny & Cher songs
1965 songs
Songs written by Sonny Bono
Song recordings with Wall of Sound arrangements